Toad of Toad Hall is a 1946 British TV adaptation of the 1929 play Toad of Toad Hall by A. A. Milne.

It was produced by Michael Barry who presented the same play again the following year with many different cast members.

Cast
Kenneth More as Badger
Jon Pertwee as Judge

References

External links

Toad of Toad Hall at Memorable TV
Toad of Toad Hall at BFI
Toad of Toad Hall at BBC

1946 television films
British television plays
Films based on works by A. A. Milne
1946 films
British black-and-white films
Films based on The Wind in the Willows
Television shows based on The Wind in the Willows